HEMU-430X (standing for High-Speed Electric Multiple Unit 430 km/h eXperimental) is a South Korean high-speed train intended for a maximum speed of . On March 31, 2013, it achieved 421.4 km/h in a test run, making South Korea the world's fourth country after France, Japan and China to develop a high-speed train running above 420 km/h. The main new feature of the train compared to older South Korean high-speed trains is distributed traction.  The commercial versions of the trains, tentatively named the EMU-260 (as of October 2022, officially "Eum") and EMU-320, were delivered to Korail from 2020–2021.

History

Later, planned top speed was reduced to the  maximum of existing high-speed trains on the market.

In a project, South Korean government research institutes and rail industry companies were directed in 1996 to fully localise high-speed rail technology.

The six-year project schedule was originally set to last until July 2013, and involved  of test runs with speeds reaching . The project is led by the Korean Railroad Research Institute (KRRI) and Hyundai Rotem, and also involves the Korea Institute of Construction & Transportation Evaluation and Planning (KICTEP), 20 other companies, 13 universities, and one other organisation. The project budget was set at 97.11 billion won, with a government contribution of 69.2 billion won.

Following a call by Nam-Hee Chae, the president of the Korea Railroad Research Institute, for proposals for a generic name for Korean-made high-speed trains, on April 5, 2007, Chae announced the name Hanvit (Hangul: 한빛), which means a streak of intense light in Korean.  Under the new naming scheme, HEMU-400X is also called Hanvit 400.

The preliminary design was presented to the public in May 2009.  A full-scale mock-up of an end car was first shown in June 2009 at the RailLog 2009 exhibition in Busan.  Detailed designs were presented in October 2010, when the prototype was expected to be completed in 2011 and start line tests in 2012.

HEMU-430X prototype
A prototype, named HEMU-430X was unveiled in May 2012. The unit is expected to undergo around 100,000 km of testing up to 2015.

Technical details

In contrast to the articulated passenger coaches between traction heads configuration of the KTX-I, HSR-350x and KTX-II trains, the 6-car HEMU-400X is fitted with distributed traction: traction equipment is underfloor and all axles of all four intermediate cars are powered. The detailed plans released in October 2010 changed the trailing end driving trailer of the experimental train into a powered car, deviating from the planned commercial version. Similarly to JR East's Fastech 360 programme, the plan is to develop and test both asynchronous induction motors and permanent magnet synchronous motors in the train.

Research in the G7 programme showed that the bulk of the longitudinal aerodynamic resistance (drag) of the pantograph and the largest component of vertical aerodynamic forces (lift) acting on it derive from the contact shoe.  For the HEMU-400X, researchers developed an aerodynamically optimised contact shoe cross section that reduced drag by about 40% and lift amplitude by about 25% in comparison to the contact shoe of the KTX-II pantographs.

The train is designed with active suspension for increased ride comfort.  To save weight, in addition to aluminum, composite materials are to be used in the carbody.  The development of new transformers, batteries and a number of other electric system components also focuses on reducing weight and size.  The train is also intended as basis for Rotem to compete in high-speed train tenders abroad, and is designed to conform with European high-speed rail standards.

Nose styling was designed using a genetic algorithm, starting with the hybridization of the nose shapes of existing French TGV and German ICE high-speed trains.  A double-deck configuration was also considered.

In the experimental train, the first two cars will test first class seating, the fourth car will be fitted out with a bar and special passenger compartments, the fifth car will test standard class seating.  Data acquisition equipment for the on-board measurements are foreseen in the third and sixth cars.

Commercial version (EMU-260/320)

EMU-260/320, formerly known as KTX-III, is the commercial derivative of HEMU-400X . It is expected to enter service in late 2020 or early 2021.  According to the initial information, In normal 8-car,  configuration, KTX-III would consist of two driving trailers at either end and six motorized intermediate cars giving 9.84 MW of power, with an option of extension to 10 cars.  The second, fourth and seventh cars will house transformers, each connected to inverter groups on the neighbouring third, fifth, respective sixth car.  The end cars will house the batteries, while pantographs will be installed on the extreme intermediate cars.

The goal for maximum operating speed was originally , which was expected to enable Seoul-Busan travel times of 1 hour 50 minutes. In the default configuration, the first two cars will be first class with 2+1 seating, the third car will house a bar and special passenger compartments with facing pairs of 3 or 2 seats, the fourth to eighth cars will be standard class with "3" seating, with foldable seats offering altogether 378 seats.

In September 2016, the designs of the EMU-260 and EMU-320 were decided, and it was known that the EMU-260 and EMU-320 will share the same design but with different patterns .

In May 2017, the EMU-260's mock-up and interior design were released to the public, and public opinion on the mock-up and interior design was collected .

The first EMU-260 was released in November 2019 into trial operation .

References

High-speed trains of South Korea
Korea Train Express
Train-related introductions in 2011
Experimental and prototype high-speed trains
25 kV AC multiple units
Hyundai Rotem multiple units